The spiny-flanked chameleon (Trioceros laterispinis), also known as the spiny-sided chameleon, is a species of chameleon endemic to the United Republic of Tanzania, East Africa. It was first described in 1932 by Arthur Loveridge.

Distribution and habitat
Trioceros laterispinis is only found in one mountain range, the Udzungwa Mountains, part of the Eastern Arc Mountains in the United Republic of Tanzania, East Africa. The type locality is Kigogo, Udzungwa Mountains, Tanzania, and another is Kibau Iyaya in the southwestern Udzungwa Mountains. T. laterispinis is collected for the international pet trade industry. The true population of the species is unknown and no trend has been found. Its habitat is forests and dense woodland and it seems to have a preference for shrubs and small understorey trees rather than towering giants. Much of the forest is fragmented into small patches and it is threatened by a high rate of destruction of its habitat for agricultural purposes. The International Union for Conservation of Nature (IUCN) classed this species as Endangered and it is listed in Appendix II of the CITES treaty. This species gives birth to live young.

Taxonomy
Trioceros laterispinis was first described in 1932 by British herpetologist and biologist Arthur Loveridge as Chamaeleon laterispinis. It was described under the same name in 1966 by Daan and Hillenius. In 1982, Böhme described it as the Chamaeleo laterispinis brookesiaeformis, and in 1999, Necas described it as the Chamaeleo laterispinis. Tilbury and Tolley described it as Trioceros laterispinis in 2009. It is commonly also known as the spiny-flanked chameleon.

References

Trioceros
Reptiles described in 1932
Taxa named by Arthur Loveridge
Reptiles of Tanzania
Endemic fauna of Tanzania